Harry Mallalieu (28 August 1896 – 1981) was an English footballer who played for Rochdale when they joined the English Football League in 1921.  He scored twice against Arsenal in the first round proper of the 1919-20 F.A. Cup.

References

Rochdale A.F.C. players
Bacup Borough F.C. players
Manchester North End F.C. players
English footballers
1896 births
1981 deaths
Footballers from Rochdale
Association footballers not categorized by position